"We'll Be Alright" is a song by Travie McCoy, released as the third single from his debut solo album, Lazarus. The song was produced by the Smeezingtons and Stereotypes and written by Rob Coombes, Danny Goffey, Philip Lawrence, Bruno Mars, Mick Quinn, Jonathan Yip, Ray Romulus and Jeremy Reeves. The song interpolates the 1995 song "Alright" by British alternative rock group Supergrass. The song has charted at number 14 in New Zealand.  A second music video features scenes from the film Prom.

In popular culture
The song was featured in the Disney film Prom and appears on its soundtrack. It was also used in a few trailers of Yogi Bear. The song was further featured in season 1 episode 22 of Hawaii Five-0, in the third episode of Love Bites, and in season 2 episode 8 of Royal Pains. The Chipmunks and the Chipettes covered the song as an exclusive iTunes bonus track on the Deluxe Digital Edition of the Alvin and the Chipmunks: Chipwrecked: Music from the Motion Picture O.S.T. A few lyrics were changed in this version.

Credits and personnel
Lead vocals – Travie McCoy
Producers – the Smeezingtons, Stereotypes
Writer(s) –  Supergrass, Jonathan Yip, Jeremy Reeves, Bruno Mars, Philip Lawrence, Ray Romulus
Label: Fueled by Ramen

Charts

Certifications

Release history

References

2010 singles
Travie McCoy songs
Songs written by Bruno Mars
Song recordings produced by the Smeezingtons
Songs written by Philip Lawrence (songwriter)
2010 songs
Fueled by Ramen singles
Songs written by Rob Coombes
Songs written by Danny Goffey
Songs written by Mick Quinn
Song recordings produced by the Stereotypes
Songs written by Jonathan Yip
Songs written by Ray Romulus
Songs written by Jeremy Reeves